Tommy Ford (born c. 1927) was a Canadian football player who played for the Toronto Argonauts, Winnipeg Blue Bombers and Saskatchewan Roughriders.

References

1920s births
Possibly living people
Year of birth uncertain
Canadian football running backs
Toronto Argonauts players
Winnipeg Blue Bombers players
Saskatchewan Roughriders players